Enoplidae is a family of nematodes belonging to the order Enoplida.

Genera
Genera:
 Enoplus Dujardin, 1845
 Hyalacanthion Wieser, 1959
 Lineolia Gerlach & Riemann, 1974
 Palaeoenoploides Mattavelli & Bracchi, 2008
 Ruamowhitia Yeates, 1967
 Savaljevia Filipjev, 1927
 Starobogatovia Platonova, 1984

References

Nematodes